Konotop  is an air base in Ukraine located 4 km west of Konotop. It is a training base.  During the end of the Cold War years, it was home to 105 UAP (105th Aviation Training Regiment) flying 101 Aero L-39 training jets.

Many helicopters and jet trainer are parked on a grassy area, appear to be unused. 

The base became a part of the territory taken in the 2022 Russian invasion of Ukraine. It is uncertain whether the base is in use, being approximately 25 km from the frontline.

See also 

 Brody Air Base
 Hostomel Airport

References
 RussianAirFields.com

Soviet Air Force bases
Ukrainian airbases